Algernonia is a plant genus of the family Euphorbiaceae first described as a genus in 1858. It is native to Peru and Brazil.

Species

References 

Euphorbiaceae genera
Euphorbioideae
Flora of South America
Taxa named by Henri Ernest Baillon